God and a Girl is the second release and debut full-length album by Christian artist/songwriter Joy Whitlock, released on Ardent Records. The album contains 14 tracks, 4 of which were on her The Fake EP released in 2005. The album title comes from the theme of Whitlock's conversations with God throughout each song. Some are written from her perspective to God, others from God to her. As on her EP, strings of struggle, pain, doubt, and redemption are woven throughout the album. "Holding on to Me" was released as the first single off the album, garnering some radio play on Christian stations in the U.S.

Track listing
 "Cost of Being Free" - 4:37 
 "Faith Don't Fail" - 3:48
 "Don't Look Down" - 4:58
 "Behind the Scenes" - 4:18
 "Holding On To Me" - 2:54
 "Testify" - 4:06
 "Not Through With You" - 2:57
 "Beautiful" - 3:24
 "Your Face" - 3:59
 "In This Hour" - 5:16
 "Traces of You" - 6:32
 "Psalms" - 5:02
 "Fake" - 4:31
 "Day of the Lord" - 5:32

Production
 Jeff Powell - Producer, Engineer
 John Hampton - Mixing
 Curry Weber - Producer, Engineer, Mixing
 Ian Eskelin - Producer
 Barry Weeks - Engineer
 Ben Phillips - Engineer
 JR McNeely - Mixing
 James Joseph - Producer
 Adam Hill  - Additional Engineering, Assistant Engineer
 Erik Flettrich - Additional Engineering
 Alan Burcham - Assistant Engineer
 Jason Gillespie - Assistant Engineer
 Jason Poff - Assistant Engineer
 Nick Redmond - Assistant Engineer
 Kevin Nix - Mastering
 Ardent Studios - Recording Location, Mixing Location
 Bletchley Park - Recording Location
 Elm Studio - Mixing Location

Musicians
 Ken Coomer - drums
 Mike Jackson - drums
 Ben Phillips - drums
 Timmy Jones - drums
 Steve Potts - drums
 Derek Shipley - bass guitar
 Tony Lucido - bass guitar
 Richard Thomas - bass guitar
 Steve Selvidge - electric guitar
 Mike Payne - electric guitar
 Philip Kenney - electric guitar
 Joy Whitlock - electric guitar, acoustic guitar, background vocals
 Tommy Burroughs - mandolin
 Rick Steff - B-3 organ, mellotron
 James Joseph - synths, programming, loops
 Jessica Munson - violin
 Jonathan Kirkscey - cello
 Rabbi Micah D. Greenstein - shofar
 Susan Marshall - background vocals
 Jackie Johnson - background vocals
 Jill Paquette - background vocals
 Candace Bennett - background vocals
 Drew Thomas - background vocals
 Todd Agnew - background vocals

External links
God and a Girl at Amazon.com
Review in The Cleveland Leader
Review at Christianity Today
Review at Jesus Freak Hideout

Joy Whitlock albums
2008 albums
Ardent Records albums